The 121st International Olympic Committee (IOC) Session was held on October 1–9, 2009 in Copenhagen, Denmark, during which Rio de Janeiro was selected as the host city of the 2016 Summer Olympics. The city of Copenhagen was chosen on February 8, 2006 by the 118th IOC Session held in Turin, Italy to stage the 13th Olympic Congress, together with the meetings of the Executive Board and the 121st IOC Session. The other candidates were Athens (Greece), Busan (South Korea), Cairo (Egypt), Riga (Latvia), Singapore (Singapore), Taipei (Chinese Taipei). Convened on the initiative of President Jacques Rogge, the 13th Olympic Congress brought together all the constituent parties of the Olympic Movement to study and discuss the current functioning of the Movement and define the main development axes for the future.

The programme for the meeting was:
 October 1–2: Part I of the IOC Session. The 2016 host city was announced on October 2: Rio de Janeiro (Brazil).
 October 3–5: The Olympic Congress.
 October 7–9: Part II of the IOC Session. Elections for IOC President and IOC Members were held, as well as the final vote on the potential inclusion of golf and rugby sevens in the 2016 Games. Both sports were approved for the 2016 programme.

2016 Olympic host city election

On October 2, 2009, the IOC voted to elect the host city of the 2016 Summer Olympics. Rio de Janeiro was elected host city after three rounds of voting. This was Rio's fourth bid for the Olympic Games.

Following Chicago's elimination, the two American IOC members were able to vote in the second and final rounds of voting.
Following Tokyo's elimination, the two Japanese IOC members were also able to vote in the final round of voting.

New sports
The Session decided to add Rugby Sevens and Golf to the Rio 2016 program. The tally for rugby was 81 in favor, with 8 against, and golf was approved 63–26. Neither sport is new to the Olympics — rugby was last featured at the Olympics in 1924, and golf in 1904.

See also
 List of IOC meetings
 117th IOC Session
 123rd IOC Session
 125th IOC Session

References

External links
 121st IOC Session and XIII Olympic Congress in Copenhagen 2009

International Olympic Committee sessions
IOC Presidential elections
2009 in Danish sport
2009 conferences
IOC Session 2009
Sport in Copenhagen
Events in Copenhagen
Sporting events in Denmark
2009 in Copenhagen